From the Cradle to the Grave may refer to:

From the Cradle to the Grave (album), a 1983 album by the Subhumans, or the title song
From the Cradle to the Grave (DVD), an unofficial biography of the band Cradle of Filth
From the Cradle to the Grave, an album by Dale Watson
"From the Cradle to the Grave", a song by Crispy Ambulance
"From the Cradle to the Grave", a song by German heavy metal band Rage from the album XIII
Von der Wiege bis zum Grabe (From the Cradle to the Grave), the 13th and last symphonic poem, S. 107 (1881–2), by Franz Liszt

See also
Cradle to the Grave (disambiguation)
Beveridge Report